The Milwaukee Milkmen are an independent baseball team based in Franklin, Wisconsin. They are members of the American Association of Professional Baseball, an official Partner League of Major League Baseball. They began play in 2019 and play home games at Franklin Field (formerly known as Routine Field).

History

Inception 2018 
The Milwaukee Milkmen were announced in February 2018, as an expansion team in the American Association of professional baseball, scheduled to begin play for the 2019 season. The team was originally announced as the thirteenth team in the league, but upon the conclusion of the 2018 season the Wichita Wingnuts suspended operations after they lost their stadium to make way for a new stadium for the MiLB AA Witchita Wind Surge. The Milkmen nickname was chosen to reflect Wisconsin's reputation as "America's Dairyland." Milkmen was among ten finalists in a "Name the Team" contest which also included: Barn Owls, Bovines, Broilers, Cheesers, Cow Tippers, Crop Dusters, Farmhands, Haymakers, and War Pigs.

First season 
May 16, 2019, the Milwaukee Milkmen began their first season. Their first game was a 13-inning affair against the St. Paul Saints.  The game included a delay due to a power failure at CHS Field. In the end, the Milkmen walked away from game with their first win, 5-4.  

Due to construction delays on their new stadium Routine Field, the Milwaukee Milkmen played their first 13 home games at Kokomo Municipal Stadium in Indiana. Kokomo is the home to the Kokomo Jackrabbits of the Northwoods league, and are owned by the parent company of Milwaukee Milkmen. The Milkmen also hired the former Jackrabbits Manager Gary McClure to be their first manager. The Milkmen's Kokomo opener was May 24, where the fell to the Chicago Dogs 5-4.  

The Milkmen opened Routine field on June 24 against the Gary SouthShore RailCats.  The Milkmen lost the game, 3-2 in 11 innings. The team finished their first season with a record of 38–62.  Routine field was renamed after the 2019 season to Franklin Field after a naming rights dispute. (See .)

First championship 

The Milkmen began their second year with new manager Anthony Barone at the helm, and the 2020 season in question due to the COVID-19 pandemic. The league, determined to hold a season, was able to find a way for six teams to play a 60 game shortened season. The Milkmen were one of the six American Association teams that continued forward with the season. There was a dispersal draft of the players on the six teams that sat out the season, allowing them the opportunity to play, and return to their original team at the end of the season. The league also suspended the leagues roster years of service rules for the season. While the Milwaukee Brewers were playing across town with no fans in the stands, the American Association had a unique policy to allow fans. Due to this the Milkmen were able to play in front of limited capacity crowds throughout the regular season and championship. The season got off to a rocky start with the third game of the opening series with the Chicago Dogs getting canceled due to a positive COVID-19 test. The Milkmen finished the season with a record of 34-26, and won their first championship over Sioux Falls in five games.

Mascot 
The Milkmen official mascot is an anthropomorphic bull named Bo Vine. He wears a white pinstriped uniform with the number 2% in reference to 2% milk. Bo Vine's name is based on the word bovine pertaining to cattle.

Season-by-season records

Roster

Notable alumni
 Manny Corpas (2019)
 TJ House (2019)
 Joey Wagman (2019)
 Henderson Álvarez (2020)
 Anthony Bender (2020)
 Tim Dillard (2020)
 Drew Hutchison (2020)
 A. J. Schugel (2020)
 David Washington (2020–2021)
 David Holmberg (2020–2021)
 Adam Brett Walker (2019–2021)
 Brian Johnson (2021)
 Misael Siverio (2021)

Managers

Player awards 

 Adam Brett Walker — 2020 Player of the year
Peyton Gray — 2020 Rookie of the year
Brett Vertigan — 2020 Defensive player of the year
Adam Brett Walker — 2021 Player of the year

References

External links

American Association of Professional Baseball teams
Professional baseball teams in Wisconsin
2018 establishments in Wisconsin
Baseball teams established in 2018
Baseball in Milwaukee
Milwaukee County, Wisconsin
Sports in the Milwaukee metropolitan area